Maria Giacomina Nazari (born February 10, 1724) was an Italian painter.

Born in Venice, Nazari was the daughter of the painter Bartolomeo Nazari; her brother Nazaro was also a painter. At the start of her career she copied her father's work in both oil and pastel. She produced religious scenes and portraits, and in the latter capacity was commissioned by Paolo Donado to produce a series of portraits of European rulers.

References

1724 births
Year of death unknown
Painters from Venice
Italian women painters
18th-century Italian painters
18th-century Italian women artists
Pastel artists
Painters from Bergamo